90th Division may refer to:

Infantry
 90th Division (1st Formation)(People's Republic of China), 1949–1950
 90th Division (2nd Formation)(People's Republic of China), 1950–1952
 90th Light Infantry Division (Wehrmacht)
 90th Infantry Division (United States)
 90th Guards Rifle Division (Soviet Union)

Armour 
 90th Guards Tank Division (Soviet Union, 1957–1985)
 90th Guards Lvov Tank Division (1985–1997) (Soviet Union, 1985–1992 and Russia, 1992–1997)
 90th Guards Tank Division (Russia, 2016–present)

Aviation 
 90th Air Division (United States)

See also
 90th Regiment (disambiguation)
 90 Squadron (disambiguation)